Simon Van Booy (born 1975) is an Anglo-American writer, currently living in the United States. His short story collection, Love Begins in Winter, won the 2009 Frank O'Connor International Short Story Award.

Fiction
Simon Van Booy has written three collections of short stories. His first collection, The Secret Lives of People in Love, was shortlisted for the 2011 Vilcek Prize for Creative Promise, while his second collection, Love Begins in Winter, won the Frank O'Connor International Short Story Award. His third collection, Tales of Accidental Genius, was released in 2015.

Van Booy's first novel, Everything Beautiful Began After, was released in 2011, and was nominated for the 2012 Indies Choice Book Award for Fiction, while his second novel, The Illusion of Separateness, was released in 2013. He released a third novel titled Father's Day in 2016.

Van Booy's fourth novel, Night Came with Many Stars, was released in 2021. NPR Books review Jason Sheehan called it Van Booy's best novel to date, writing “It is a heartbreaking book, a gorgeous book . . . In Night, Van Booy finds the weakness, grace and beauty of common lives fully lived.”  Boston Globe columnist Joan Frank wrote “Kindness and raw luck undergird Night Came with Many Stars… And like Dickens’s young heroes, Van Booy’s determined souls act with their whole hearts—as does this brave, fierce novel—to earn what good may come.”  USA Today named Night Came with Many Stars to a list of “5 Books Not to Miss.” 

In 2010, Van Booy released his first children's book, Pobble's Way, to be followed by Gertie Milk and the Keeper of Lost Things in 2017.

Other works

Van Booy is the editor of three volumes of philosophy, entitled Why We Fight, Why We Need Love, and Why Our Decisions Don't Matter.

Van Booy's essays have been published in newspapers internationally, including The New York Times, The New York Post, The Daily Telegraph, The Guardian, and The Times. They have also been broadcast on National Public Radio.

In 2011, Van Booy delivered his first full-length stage comedy, and wrote an award-winning short film for the Morgans Hotel Group called Love Is Like Life But Longer.

Teaching and lecturing
Van Booy lectures frequently at schools, universities, and libraries in the United States, the United Kingdom, and in China. He teaches part-time at the School of Visual Arts in New York City, and at Long Island University, C.W. Post Campus. He is an advocate of education as a means of social reform, and involved in the Rutgers University Early College Humanities program (REaCH) for young adults living in under-served communities.

Design
Since 2009, Partners & Spade have carried Van Booy's "custom vintage Antarctic explorers' skis," and cold-weather hats, which he designed to support research in Antarctic regions and raise awareness for the Scott Polar Research Institute at University of Cambridge.

In translation
Van Booy's fiction and essays have been translated into over eighteen languages throughout the world. In 2011 he embarked on a multiple city reading tour of China, where his books are available in two different varieties of Chinese.

Criticism
His short story collections received positive reviews from The New York Times and the Los Angeles Times 

Publishers Weekly gave The Illusion of Separateness a starred review, and said "the writing is what makes this remarkable book soar". 

Booklist, the publication of the American Library Association, praised Van Booy's fourth novel, Night Came with Many Stars, writing “A beautifully realized, multigenerational family novel that is exceptional for its memorable, fully developed characters. Readers will become emotionally invested…invited to consider the meaning of family and the power of memory.”

Personal life
Van Booy grew up in Ruthin and Oxford, and currently resides in New York. He has one daughter, and married Christina Daigneault in 2013.

List of works
 2002: Love & The Five Senses won the H.R. Hays Poetry Prize
 2007: The Secret Lives of People in Love
 2009: Love Begins in Winter won the Frank O'Connor International Short Story Award
 2010: Pobble's Way won Society of School Librarians International Honor Book Award
 2011: Why We Need Love
 2011: Why Our Decisions Don't Matter
 2011: Why We Fight
 2011: Everything Beautiful Began After
 2012: The Illusion of Separateness 
 2015: Tales of Accidental Genius: Stories
 2016: Father’s Day
 2017: Gertie Milk & the Keeper of Lost Things
 2018: Gertie Milk & the Great Keeper Rescue
 2018: The Sadness of Beautiful Things
2021: Night Came with Many Stars

References

29.

External links
 
 The Secret Lives of People in Love
 Love Begins in Winter
 Why We Need Love
 Why We Fight
 Why Our Decisions Don't Matter
  Gertie Milk & the Keeper of Lost Things
 Gertie Milk & the Great Keeper Rescue
  The Sadness of Beautiful Things
Night Came with Many Stars

1975 births
Living people
British short story writers
Place of birth missing (living people)
21st-century British novelists
21st-century American writers
21st-century British short story writers
Southampton College alumni